Dynamo Stadium or Dinamo Stadium is a stadium that often associated with the Dynamo (sports society).

It may also refer to:

Albania
Selman Stërmasi Stadium, Tirana, formerly "Dinamo Stadium"

Belarus
Dinamo Stadium (Brest), Belarus
Dinamo Stadium (Minsk), Belarus

Georgia
Boris Paichadze Dinamo Arena, also known as the Dinamo Stadium, Tbilisi, Georgia

Germany
 Stadion Dresden (in the 1970s), Dresden, Germany

Moldova
Dinamo Stadium (Bender), Moldova
Dinamo Stadium (Chişinău), Moldova

Romania
Dinamo Stadium (Bucharest), Romania

Russia
Dynamo Stadium (Barnaul)
Dynamo Stadium (Bryansk)
Dynamo Stadium (Makhachkala)
Dynamo Stadium (Moscow)
Dynamo Stadium (Stavropol)
Dynamo Stadium (Ufa)
Dynamo Stadium (Vladivostok)

Ukraine
Dynamo Stadium (Dnipropetrovsk), today place of the Towers Apartments Hotel
Dynamo Stadium (Kharkiv), Ukraine
Lobanovsky Dynamo Stadium, Kyiv, Ukraine
Dynamo Stadium (Odessa), Ukraine
Dynamo Stadium, former name of Tsentralnyi Stadion (Zhytomyr)

Uzbekistan
Dynamo Samarkand Stadium, Samarkand, Uzbekistan

Dynamo sports society